In mathematics, specifically in category theory and algebraic topology, the Baez–Dolan stabilization hypothesis, proposed in , states that suspension of a weak n-category has no more essential effect after n + 2 times.

References

Sources

External links 
https://ncatlab.org/nlab/show/stabilization+hypothesis

Algebraic topology
Higher category theory